The 2008-09 Philippine Basketball Association (PBA) Philippine Cup or known as the 2008-09 KFC PBA Philippine Cup for sponsorship reasons, is the first conference of the 2008-09 PBA season. The tournament started on October 4, 2008, and ended on February 11, 2009. The new conference will have games on Thursdays and Saturdays. The tournament is an All-Filipino format, which bans an import or a pure-foreign player for each team.

The tournament featured the first ever regular season game played in Singapore. It was played at the Singapore Indoor Stadium between the Talk 'N Text Tropang Texters and the San Miguel Beermen on November 30.

Format
The following format was observed for the duration of the conference:
 Double-round robin eliminations; 18 games per team; Teams are then seeded by basis on win–loss records. Ties are broken among points differences of the tied teams if the teams are not tied for #2, #5 or #9. If tied on those seeds, an extra game will be played to determine which team clinches the higher seed.
 Teams seeded #6 vs # 9 and #7 vs # 8 both games is knock out then winner of both games advance the next knock out games to determine witch teams go to quarterfinals
 #3, #4 and #5 teams automatically advance to the best of three quarterfinals:
 #3 team vs. winner of knockout wildcard
 #4 vs. #5 teams
 #1 and #2 teams automatically advance to the best of seven semifinals:
Winner of first quarterfinal vs. #1
Winner of second quarterfinal vs. #2
The winners in the semifinals advance to the best-of-seven Finals. The losers dispute the third-place trophy in a one-game playoff.

Elimination round

Team standings

Schedule

Bracket

Wildcard phase

First round

Second round

Quarterfinals

(3) Barangay Ginebra vs. (6) San Miguel

In a battle of the two teams owned by the San Miguel Corporation, the Beermen escaped with a one-point win at game 1. The Kings averted elimination when the Beermen collapsed at Game 2, but Dondon Hontiveros lead the charge at game 3's fourth quarter to prevent a second-consecutive PBA championship for Ginebra as the Beermen closed out the Kings in a sold-out Cuneta Astrodome.

(4) Rain or Shine vs (5) Sta. Lucia

In their first playoff appearance since joining the league in 2006, the Elasto Painters were overwhelmed in Game 1 by the defending champions, who played with the comebacking Ryan Reyes who just came from injury. Fracas involving Rain or Shine's Gabe Norwood and Solomon Mercado at the end of the first game caused Norwood to be suspended in Game 2, and Mercado on Game 3 if it happens. The short-handed Elasto Painters wound up short in Game 2 as they were eliminated.

Semifinals

(1) Alaska vs (5) Sta. Lucia

In a rematch of the 2007-08 semifinals series, the Aces won two consecutive game to lead the series 2–0. However, the Realtors won Game 3 to cut the series lead. But Alaska, seeking to prevent what happened last year, won Game 4 to take a commanding 3–1 series lead. Sta. Lucia won Game 5 but they came out short in Game 6 with Willie Miller having an all-around performance to lead the Aces to a rematch of the 2007 PBA Fiesta Conference Finals against Talk 'N Text.

(2) Talk 'N Text vs. (6) San Miguel

Unlike the other semifinal which was a slow defensive battle, the Talk 'N Text–San Miguel matchup was a high-scoring offensive-minded series, with both teams passing the century mark in all of the games. The Texters walloped the winded Beermen in Game 1 with a 29-point win, but the Beermen were able to get even with a Game 2 victory. The Texters escaped at Game 3 thanks to Jimmy Alapag's clutch baskets, despite Hontiveros' 39-point explosion.

In a do-or-die Game 5, Marc Pingris and former Talk 'N Text player Jay Washington had double-double efforts to prevent the Texters from barging in the Finals. With Yancy de Ocampo was suspended after committing a flagrant foul-penalty 2 against Danny Seigle in Game 6, his brother Ranidel was ejected in the second quarter with the same offense. The game was close until the third quarter when the Texters made a run, but the Beermen tied the game at the end of the fourth quarter; Alapag missed a go-ahead tree-pointer as time expired to force overtime. With 1:57 left in overtime, Washington scored on a put-back to put SMB up 115–113. On the next possession, Mark Cardona converted his own three-pointer to put TNT up 116–115. Washington missed a short stab, and Harvey Carey missed his own shot at the other end. Ali Peek tapped the ball, and Cardona grabbed it as time expired, to lead the Texters into the Finals.

Third place playoff

Finals

Awards
Finals MVP: Mark Cardona (Talk 'N Text)
Best Player of the Conference: Willie Miller (Alaska Aces)
Players of the Week:
October 4–5: Solomon Mercado (Rain or Shine Elasto Painters)
October 6–12: Junjun Cabatu (Barangay Ginebra Kings)
October 13–19: Jay Washington (San Miguel Beermen) and Willie Miller (Alaska Aces)
October 20–26: Asi Taulava (Coca-Cola Tigers)
October 27 – November 2: James Yap and Kerby Raymundo (Purefoods TJ Giants)
November 3–9: Gary David (Air21 Express)
November 10–16: Mark Cardona (Talk 'N Text Tropang Texters)
November 17–23: Joseph Yeo (Sta. Lucia Realtors) and Ronjay Buenafe (Coca-Cola Tigers)
November 24–30: Jimmy Alapag (Talk 'N Text Tropang Texters)
December 1 – 7: Ranidel de Ocampo (Talk 'N Text Tropang Texters)
December 8–14: Jeffrei Chan (Red Bull Barako)
December 15–21: John Arigo (Coca-Cola Tigers) and Joseph Yeo (Sta. Lucia Realtors)
December 22–28: Ranidel de Ocampo (Talk 'N Text Tropang Texters)
December 29 – January 4: Bonbon Custodio (San Miguel Beermen)
January 5–11: Dondon Hontiveros (San Miguel Beermen)
January 12–18: Jimmy Alapag (Talk 'N Text Tropang Texters)
January 19–25: Mark Cardona (Talk 'N Text Tropang Texters)

Conference records
Records marked with an asterisk (*) were accomplished with one or more overtime periods.

Team

Individual

Statistical leaders

References

External links
 PBA.ph

PBA Philippine Cup
Philippine Cup